Julian Rekdahl Faye Lund (born 20 May 1999) is a Norwegian football goalkeeper who plays for Bodø/Glimt.

Career
Faye Lund played for Oppsal in his early career, and joined Rosenborg in the middle of the 2015 season.

In 2017 he was sent out on loan to Levanger in the OBOS-ligaen. After starting the first matches on the bench he went on to become a regular starter for the team. At the end of the season the loan was extended for the 2018 season. In 2019 he was loaned out to Mjøndalen.

Career statistics

References

1999 births
Living people
Footballers from Oslo
Norwegian footballers
Norway youth international footballers
Norway under-21 international footballers
Association football goalkeepers
Rosenborg BK players
Levanger FK players
Mjøndalen IF players
Eliteserien players
Norwegian First Division players